Justin Gunnar Holl (born January 30, 1992) is an American professional ice hockey defenseman currently playing for  the Toronto Maple Leafs of the National Hockey League (NHL). He was originally drafted in the second round, 54th overall, by the Chicago Blackhawks in the 2010 NHL Entry Draft. 

In 2018, Holl became the first defenseman in Maple Leaf history to record two goals in his first two NHL games. In the same year, he helped the American Hockey League (AHL)'s Toronto Marlies win their first Calder Cup. He currently plays on the Leafs 3rd D pairing.

Playing career

Early career
Holl attended Minnetonka High School from 2007 to 2010. In his senior year at Minnetonka High School, Holl was named co-captain alongside Jake Gardiner and made the honor roll. On November 20, 2009, he signed a commitment agreement with the Minnesota Golden Gophers at the University of Minnesota. At the conclusion of the season, Holl was named a finalist for Minnesota Mr. Hockey, an award given to the best senior high school hockey player in Minnesota.

Collegiate
Holl was selected by the Chicago Blackhawks in the second round, 54th overall, in the 2010 NHL Entry Draft; however, he kept his commitment to play for the University of Minnesota. While studying at the University of Minnesota, Holl majored in Finance at the Carlson School of Management.  In his first season with the Gophers, he played in 25 games and recorded 7 points, including one goal. After his freshman season, he was invited to Team USA's National Junior Evaluation Camp in August.

In his sophomore season, Holl's role on the Gophers deviated from defence to offence occasionally throughout the year. After recording three goals and seven points, he was presented with the Gophers Dr. V. George Nagobads Unsung Hero. The next year, Holl helped the Gophers qualify for the 2014 NCAA Frozen Four where he recorded his first collegiate goal that season with 0.6 seconds left in the game to beat North Dakota 2–1. After his senior season, Holl split his time during the 2014–15 season between Chicago's minor league affiliates: the Indy Fuel of the ECHL and the Rockford IceHogs of the American Hockey League (AHL).

Professional
Since he never signed an entry-level contract with the Blackhawks, Holl was a free agent and signed an AHL contract with the Toronto Marlies in 2015. One year later, on July 2, 2016, he signed an NHL entry-level contract with the Toronto Maple Leafs. He was assigned to the Marlies for the 2016–17 season. During the 2016–17 season, he was named an alternate captain for the Marlies.

During the 2017–18 season, Holl was selected for the 2018 AHL All-Star Game in Utica, New York. He was called up to the NHL on an emergency basis on January 31, 2018, to replace an ill Ron Hainsey. He made his NHL debut that night in a game against the New York Islanders. During this game, he scored his first NHL goal to help the Leafs win 5–0. It marked the first time since 1978 that a Maple Leafs defenseman scored in his NHL debut. On February 1, in a game against the New York Rangers, Holl scored his second NHL goal to become the first Maple Leafs defenseman to score two goals in his first two games. As well, he became only the sixth defenseman in NHL history to score in each of his first two games.

He was reassigned to the Marlies on February 3 after defenseman Morgan Rielly was activated off injured reserve. Holl continued to succeed in the AHL, setting a new career-high in points and assists during the regular season. During the 2018 Calder Cup playoffs, he recorded 5 points in 20 games to help the Marlies win their first Calder Cup in franchise history.

On July 3, 2018, Holl signed a two-year, $1.35 million contract extension with the Maple Leafs. He attended the Leafs' training camp prior to the 2018–19 season and was named to the opening night roster. He was a healthy scratch for the Leafs' first 12 games of the season, playing in his first game on November 1 against the Dallas Stars. As a result of injuries and illnesses, Holl replaced Igor Ozhiganov in the Leafs lineup and recorded his first career assist in a 7–6 win over the Philadelphia Flyers on March 15, 2019.

The following season, Holl entered a bigger role with the Leafs after the firing of Mike Babcock. He consistently played on one of the Leafs top pairings alongside Jake Muzzin and later Travis Dermott due to injuries. In this increased role, he earned his first multi point game on December 11 against the Vancouver Canucks. He eventually signed a three year contract extension with the Maple Leafs on December 31 before their game against his hometown team, the Minnesota Wild.

Personal life
His biological father Jerry is an author who published a book detailing his bike ride from Alaska to Mexico.

Holl’s cousin Mike Erickson also played hockey for the University of Minnesota and was drafted 72nd overall by the Minnesota Wild in the 2002 NHL Entry Draft. He married his fiancé Audrey in August 2019.

Career statistics

Awards and honors

References

External links

 

1992 births
Living people
American expatriate ice hockey players in Canada
American men's ice hockey defensemen
Chicago Blackhawks draft picks
Ice hockey players from Minnesota
Indy Fuel players
Minnesota Golden Gophers men's ice hockey players
Omaha Lancers players
People from Hennepin County, Minnesota
Rockford IceHogs (AHL) players
Toronto Maple Leafs players
Toronto Marlies players